Robert Anderson was a 19th-century Scottish inventor, best known for inventing the first crude electric carriage in Scotland around the time of 1832–1839. Robert Anderson was an important person for helping invent the first electric car. The carriage was powered by non-rechargeable primary power cells.

See also
History of the electric vehicle

References

Scottish inventors
Year of death missing
Year of birth missing